Biston mediolata is a moth of the family Geometridae. It is found in China (Shaanxi, Gansu, Hubei, Hunan, Fujian, Hainan, Guangxi, Sichuan) and Vietnam.

Etymology
The specific name is from the Latin prefix medio and the word latus, which means medially and broad, referring to the shape of the valva.

References

Moths described in 2011
Bistonini